Saint-Élie is a commune of French Guiana, an overseas department and region of France in South America. In 1930, Saint-Élie became capital of the Inini territory. From 1953 onward, the commune was called Centre. In 1969, it was renamed to Saint-Élie.

History

In 1873, gold was discovered in Saint-Élie. The mines were in the middle of the rain forest with no river connection to the outside world. In 1884 construction began on a Decauville railway line to Gare Tigre near Saint-Nazaire in order to access the Sinnamary River. 

The railway line needed frequent repairs, and had over 100 bridges. In 1990, the railway line was abandoned when a road opened. The roads ends near Saint-Nazaire, and a 45 minute ferry to Petit-Saut Dam is needed to reach the outside world.

Gold is still the backbone of the economy. The gold mines are currently being exploited by Newmont Mining Corporation. In 1989, construction started on the Petit-Saut Dam to produce hydroelectric power. The dam was completed in 1994.

Nature
In 1996, La Trinité National Nature Reserve was founded. It covers 76,903 hectares and is primary tropical rain forest located in the heart of the Guyana plateau forest.

Villages
 Saint-Nazaire

See also
Communes of French Guiana

References

External links
Official website (in French)

Communes of French Guiana